The Undertaker is a Czech comedy film directed by Karel Lamač. It was released in 1932.

Cast
 Vlasta Burian - Pleticha
 Josef Rovenský - Boleslav Hnipírdo
 Betty Kysilková - Frantiska Plicová
 Růžena Šlemrová - Anna Plicová
 Jan Sviták - Franz, her beau
 Václav Menger - The Uncle
 Jan Richter - The Railway Inspector
 Martin Frič - The Inspector's Clerk
 Theodor Pištěk - Mr. Klapka
 Viktor Nejedlý - Mr. Lux
 Radola Renský - The Boy
 Milka Balek-Brodská - The Sister-in-law, his mother
 Dalibor Ptak - The Pianist
 Lída Baarová - Miss Rozmarová

External links
 

1932 films
1932 comedy films
Czechoslovak black-and-white films
Films directed by Karel Lamač
Czechoslovak comedy films
1930s Czech films